Hindu Temple of Minnesota is a Hindu Temple located in Maple Grove serving the over 40,000 Hindus in the Minneapolis Metropolitan Area. It has a floor space of over 43,000 square feet, making it one of the largest Hindu temples in the United States. It has the capacity to accommodate up to 5,000 people at one time.

History
The Hindu Temple had its first major renovation in 1979 under the direction of Mr. Arun Shirole, and the first statue of Ganesha donated by Drs. Kumud & Sashikant Sane was installed in 1983.  Many statues continued to be donated in subsequent years. The Hindu Temple was vandalized in April 2006 during a $9 million Temple construction  to build 21 mini temples. Currently, the temple is planning to develop adjacent  60 acre agricultural land for community use  such as senior housing, condos, staff quarters, school solar energy farm and a yoga retreat center.

See also
List of Hindu temples in the United States
Hindu Society of Minnesota Raja Gopuram Mahotsav publication June 26-28, 2009.

References
4.  ^ https://hindumandirmn.org/Home/HSMWiki/tabid/64/Default.aspx?topic=Building+Hindu+Temple+in+Minnesota

Buildings and structures in Hennepin County, Minnesota
Hinduism in the United States
Religious buildings and structures completed in 2006
2006 establishments in Minnesota
Religious organizations established in 2006
Asian-American culture in Minnesota
Religious buildings and structures in Minnesota
Indian-American culture in Minnesota